Oğuz Savaş (born 13 July 1987) is a Turkish professional basketball player for Bahçeşehir Koleji of the Basketbol Süper Ligi (BSL) and Basketball Champions League. He has also represented the senior Turkey national basketball team.

Professional career

Oğuz Savaş made his professional debut in Ülkerspor when he was 19. That year, he helped his team crush their way to the league championship. Savaş contributed 6.0 points and 3.2 rebound in his first season.

When Ülkerspor merged with Fenerbahçe, Oğuz Savaş also became part of the new team. He has been a consistent and successful player for Fenerbahçe ever since.

On 26 March 2015, Savaş scored 7 points against Unicaja Malaga and reached 1000 career EuroLeague points.

In the summer of 2015, Savaş signed with Darüşşafaka.

On 15 August 2018, Savaş re-signed with Darüşşafaka for the 2018–19 season.

On 3 October 2019 he has signed with Beşiktaş Sompo Japan of the Turkish Basketball Super League (BSL).

On July 17, 2020, he has signed with Bursaspor of the Turkish Basketball Super League (BSL).

On July 8, 2021, he has signed with Bahçeşehir Koleji of the Turkish Basketbol Süper Ligi (BSL).

Turkey national team
Savaş has been a regular member of the senior Turkey national basketball team, and he won the silver medal at the 2010 FIBA World Championship.

Private life
Oğuz Savaş is married to Melike Demirkaya since 2010.

References

External links

 Oğuz Savaş at draftexpress.com
 Oğuz Savaş at euroleague.net
 Oğuz Savaş at fenerbahce.org
 Oğuz Savaş at tblstat.net
 Oğuz Savaş at fiba.com

1987 births
Living people
2010 FIBA World Championship players
2014 FIBA Basketball World Cup players
Bahçeşehir Koleji S.K. players
Beşiktaş men's basketball players
Bursaspor Basketbol players
Centers (basketball)
Competitors at the 2013 Mediterranean Games
Darüşşafaka Basketbol players
Fenerbahçe men's basketball players
Mediterranean Games gold medalists for Turkey
Mediterranean Games medalists in basketball
Sportspeople from Balıkesir
Turkish men's basketball players
Ülker G.S.K. basketball players